Andrey Alexandrovich Kirilov; born 13 January 1967) is a Russian cross-country skier who competed in the early 1990s. He earned a bronze medal in the 4 × 10 km relay at the 1993 FIS Nordic World Ski Championships in Falun. He finished fifth in the 4 × 10 km relay at the 1992 Winter Olympics in Albertville as part of the Unified Team and repeated that finish as part of Russia at Lillehammer in 1994.

Cross-country skiing results
All results are sourced from the International Ski Federation (FIS).

Olympic Games

World Championships
1 medal – (1 bronze)

World Cup

Season standings

Team podiums

 1 victory 
 3 podiums

Note:  Until the 1999 World Championships, World Championship races were included in the World Cup scoring system.

References

External links
World Championship results 

1967 births
Living people
Cross-country skiers at the 1992 Winter Olympics
Cross-country skiers at the 1994 Winter Olympics
Russian male cross-country skiers
Soviet male cross-country skiers
Olympic cross-country skiers of the Unified Team
Olympic cross-country skiers of Russia
FIS Nordic World Ski Championships medalists in cross-country skiing